The 2006 Tour de Hongrie was the 33rd edition of the Tour de Hongrie cycle race and was held from 26 to 29 July 2006. The race started in Miskolc and finished in Bükkszentkereszt. The race was won by Martin Riška.

General classification

References

2006
Tour de Hongrie
Tour de Hongrie